Nosequien Y Los Nosecuantos is a Peruvian pop rock band.

Albums
No Somos Nada (1990)
Con El Respeto Que Se Merecen (1991)
11 Porotazos Superbailables (1993)
Lo Mejor (o sea, Todo) de Nosequien y los Nosecuantos [compilation]
Walter (1995)
Etiqueta Negra [compilation]
Amorfo (2000)
Nadie Nos Quitará Lo Bailado [compilation]
Pisco Sour (2005)
La Tierra del Sol (2009) [single]
XX Larga Duración (2012)
Pisco Sour (2013)

Peruvian rock music groups